Taylor House may refer to:

 Taylor House (ice hockey), American professional ice hockey player

Taylor House or Taylor Mansion or variations may refer to any of a number of constructions in the United States (by state, then city):
 Taylor-Stokes House, Marcella, Arkansas, listed on the National Register of Historic Places (NRHP) in Stone County
 Taylor Log House and Site, Winchester, Arkansas, listed on the NRHP in Drew County
 Taylor House (West Covina, California), a house museum in Los Angeles County
Taylor House (Denver, Colorado), a Denver Landmark
 Edward T. Taylor House, Glenwood Springs, Colorado, listed on the NRHP in Garfield County
 Day-Taylor House, Hartford, Connecticut, listed on the NRHP in Hartford County
 Moses J. Taylor House, Eustis, Florida, listed on the NRHP in Lake County
 Taylor Hall (Hawkinsville, Georgia), listed on the NRHP in Pulaski County
 William Taylor House (Resaca, Georgia), listed on the NRHP in Gordon County
 Taylor House (Summerville, Georgia)
 Arthur Taylor House (Paris, Idaho), listed on the NRHP in Bear Lake County
 Oscar Taylor House, Freeport, Illinois, listed on the NRHP in Stephenson County
 Taylor-Zent House, Huntington, Indiana, listed on the NRHP in Huntington County
 Fernando G. Taylor House, Versailles, Indiana, listed on the NRHP in Ripley County
 Taylor House (Baldwin, Kentucky), listed on the NRHP in Madison County
 William Taylor House (Becknerville, Kentucky), listed on the NRHP in Clark County
 Matheny-Taylor House, Harrodsburg, Kentucky, listed on the NRHP in Mercer County
 Capt. Samuel Taylor House, Harrodsburg, Kentucky, listed on the NRHP in Mercer County
 J.B. Taylor and Son Feed Store, Lewisport, Kentucky, listed on the NRHP in Hancock County
 Zachary Taylor House, Louisville, Kentucky, listed on the NRHP in Jefferson County
 Phillip R. Taylor House, Louisville, Kentucky, listed on the NRHP in Oldham County
 E.W. Taylor House, Midway, Kentucky, listed on the NRHP in Woodford County
 Ridge Taylor Farm, Nicholasville, Kentucky, listed on the NRHP in Jessamine County
 Taylor House (Richmond, Kentucky), listed on the NRHP in Madison County
 Taylor House (Jackson, Louisiana), listed on the NRHP in East Feliciana Parish
 Calvin B. Taylor House, Berlin, Maryland, a house museum in Worcester County
 Taylor-Dallin House, Arlington, Massachusetts, listed on the NRHP in Middlesex County
 Dowley-Taylor House, Worcester, Massachusetts, listed on the NRHP in Worcester County
 Elisha Taylor House, Detroit, Michigan, listed on the NRHP in Wayne County
 George W. Taylor House, Le Sueur, Minnesota, listed on the NRHP in Le Sueur County
 Taylor House (Bay St. Louis, Mississippi), formerly listed on the NRHP in Hancock County (destroyed by Hurricane Katrina)
 Taylor-Falls House, Como, Mississippi, listed on the NRHP in Panola County
 Taylor-Mansker House, Como, Mississippi, listed on the NRHP in Panola County
 Tait-Taylor House, Como, Mississippi, listed on the NRHP in Panola County
 Adams-Taylor-McRae House, Elwood, Mississippi, listed on the NRHP in Clarke County
 Taylor-Wall-Yancy House, Sardis, Mississippi, listed on the NRHP in Panola County
 John N. and Elizabeth Taylor House, Columbia, Missouri, listed on the NRHP in Boone County
 A. Taylor Ray House, Gallatin, Missouri, listed on the NRHP in Daviess County
 Ray E. Taylor House, Whitefish, Montana, listed on the NRHP in Flathead County
 Chauncey S. Taylor House, David City, Nebraska, listed on the NRHP in Butler County
 Eddy-Taylor House, Lincoln, Nebraska, listed on the NRHP in Lancaster County
 Dr. Henry Genet Taylor House and Office, Camden, New Jersey, listed on the NRHP in Camden County
 Taylor-Newbold House, Chesterfield, New Jersey, listed on the NRHP in Burlington County
 George Taylor House (Freehold Borough, New Jersey), listed on the NRHP in New Monmouth County
 William Taylor House (Middleport, New York), listed on the NRHP in Niagara County
 Taylor–Corwin House, Pine Bush, New York, listed on the NRHP in Orange County
 Smith-Taylor Cabin, Shelter Island, New York, listed on the NRHP in Suffolk County
 Emma Flower Taylor Mansion, Watertown, New York, listed on the NRHP in Jefferson County
 Dempsey-Reynolds-Taylor House, Eden, North Carolina, listed on the NRHP in Rockingham County
 Taylor-Utley House, Fayetteville, North Carolina, listed on the NRHP in Cumberland County
 Col. Richard P. Taylor House, Huntsboro, North Carolina, listed on the NRHP in Granville County
 Patty Person Taylor House, Louisburg, North Carolina, listed on the NRHP in Franklin County
 Isaac Taylor House, New Bern, North Carolina, listed on the NRHP in Craven County
 Archibald Taylor Plantation House, Oxford, North Carolina, listed on the NRHP in Granville County
 Leslie-Taylor House, Vass, North Carolina, listed on the NRHP in Moore County
 Archibald Taylor House, Wood, North Carolina, listed on the NRHP in Franklin County
 Taylor-Frohman House, Sandusky, Ohio, listed on the NRHP in Erie County
 George Taylor House (Corvallis, Oregon), listed on the NRHP in Benton County
 Jack Taylor House, Corvallis, Oregon, listed on the NRHP in Benton County
 Dr. W.R. and Eunice Taylor House, Forest Grove, Oregon, listed on the NRHP in Washington County
 Fred E. Taylor House, Portland, Oregon, listed on the NRHP in Multnomah County
 Peter Taylor House and Gotlieb Haehlen House, Portland, Oregon, listed on the NRHP in Multnomah County
 Fulton–Taylor House, The Dalles, Oregon, listed on the NRHP in Wasco County
 Gray-Taylor House, Brookville, Pennsylvania, listed on the NRHP in Jefferson County
 Phillip Taylor House, Brookville, Pennsylvania, listed on the NRHP in Jefferson County
 George Taylor House (Catasauqua, Pennsylvania), a U.S. National Historic Landmark listed on the NRHP in Lehigh County
 Parsons-Taylor House, Easton, Pennsylvania, listed on the NRHP in Northampton County
 Taylor House (Marshallton, Pennsylvania), listed on the NRHP in Chester County
 Peter Taylor Farmstead, Newtown, Pennsylvania, listed on the NRHP in Bucks County
 Benjamin Taylor Homestead, Newtown, Pennsylvania, listed on the NRHP in Bucks County
 Taylor–Chase–Smythe House, Newport, Rhode Island, listed on the NRHP in Newport County
 Taylor House (Columbia, South Carolina), |listed on the NRHP in Richland County
 Earle R. Taylor House and Peach Packing Shed, Greer, South Carolina, listed on the NRHP in Greenville County
 J. W. Taylor House, Canton, South Dakota, listed on the NRHP in Lincoln County
 Christopher Taylor House, Jonesboro, Tennessee, listed on the NRHP in Washington County
 Col. Robert Z. Taylor House, Trenton, Tennessee, listed on the NRHP in Gibson County
 Campbell Taylor and Greenlief Fisk House, Bastrop, Texas, listed on the NRHP in Bastrop County
 Taylor-Cooper House, Georgetown, Texas, listed on the NRHP in Williamson County
 Judson L. Taylor House, Houston, Texas, listed on the NRHP in Harris County
 Hodge-Taylor House, Jefferson, Texas, listed on the NRHP in Marion County
 J. H. Taylor House, McKinney, Texas, listed on the NRHP in Collin County
 Durst-Taylor House, Nacogdoches, Texas, listed on the NRHP in Nacogdoches County
 Umphress-Taylor House, Van Alstyne, Texas, listed on the NRHP in Grayson County
 John W., Janet (Nettie), and May Rich Taylor House, Farmington, Utah, listed on the NRHP in Davis County
 Arthur Taylor House (Moab, Utah), listed on the NRHP in Grand County
 Clark–Taylor House, Provo, Utah, listed on the NRHP in Utah County
 Thomas N. Taylor House, Provo, Utah, listed on the NRHP in Utah County
 George Taylor Jr. House, Provo, Utah, listed on the NRHP in Utah County
 Taylor–Whittle House, Norfolk, Virginia, listed on the NRHP
 Taylor–Mayo House, Richmond, Virginia, listed on the NRHP
 Brooker-Taylor House, Yakima, Washington, listed on the NRHP in Yakima County
 Taylor-Condry House, Elkins, West Virginia, listed on the NRHP in Randolph County
 A. E. Taylor House, Clinton, Wisconsin, listed on the NRHP in Rock County
 David Taylor House, Sheboygan, Wisconsin, listed on the NRHP in Sheboygan County

See also
Taylor Hall (disambiguation)
Arthur Taylor House (disambiguation)
George Taylor House (disambiguation)
William Taylor House (disambiguation)